Sergey Yuryevich Filimonov (born February 2, 1975) is a Kazakhstani weightlifter who competed in the Men's 77 kg at the 2004 Summer Olympics and won the silver medal with 372.5 kg in total.

He has been a scholarship holder with the Olympic Solidarity program since November 2002. Filimonov represented Russia at the 1996 Summer Olympics in Atlanta, Georgia.

References 
 Sports-reference

1975 births
Living people
Russian male weightlifters
Kazakhstani male weightlifters
Olympic weightlifters of Russia
Olympic weightlifters of Kazakhstan
Weightlifters at the 1996 Summer Olympics
Weightlifters at the 2000 Summer Olympics
Weightlifters at the 2004 Summer Olympics
Olympic silver medalists for Kazakhstan
Olympic medalists in weightlifting
Asian Games medalists in weightlifting
Weightlifters at the 1998 Asian Games
Weightlifters at the 2002 Asian Games
Medalists at the 2004 Summer Olympics
Asian Games gold medalists for Kazakhstan
Asian Games bronze medalists for Kazakhstan

Medalists at the 1998 Asian Games
Medalists at the 2002 Asian Games
European Weightlifting Championships medalists
People from Almaty Region